Shivani  is a village and hobli headquarters (PIN-577549) in Ajjampura Taluk, Chikkamagaluru district, Karnataka, India.

Before the dawn of the bore-well era, the community well (known in Kannada as "Gopinathana Baavi", a historic landmark) was the primary source of drinking water in the village.

Shivani Kere, a small reservoir/lake located on the northern edge of the village, is the principal body of water in the Shivani basin. However, this reservoir almost dries up during the summer months.

There are several Hindu temples located within the village Veeranjaneya, Beeralingeshwara, Keresanthe, Laxmidevi, Revanasiddeswara, Bhandimaramma, Gosappa, gullamma, Kedareswara, satyanarayana, Banashankari temple, kupendra swamy, rudreshwara temple etc.

The Car Festival of Anjaneya Swamy (a.k.a., Anjaneyana Theru/Ratha, Hanumappana Theru) and Gullammana Habba are the popular annual event.

Anjaneya temple Road, Camp Road, Ganeshana Beedhi, MG Road, Main Street, Tank Road, Banashankari Street are some of the important streets of Shivani.

Facilities
 Government primary health centre
 Government veterinary dispensary
 High school
 Junior college
 Police outpost
 Post office
 A branch of the Corporation Bank
peoples convent [eng. medium]

Railway station
Shivani (SHV) Railway Station is located almost two kilometres east of Shivani town and one kilometer west of Bandre village and falls within the Mysore Division of the South Western Railway Zone of Indian Railways. This railway station was the watering station for all the steam engines during the meter gauge when the steam engines existed. All the trains stopped here to fill water for the further journey. This station has a 10,000-litre-capacity overhead tank built in 1934.

Several passenger trains make a stop at this railway station. From here one can catch direct trains to go to places like Bangalore and Davangere. The other closest railway stations are Ajjampura (towards Bangalore) and Hosadurga Road (towards Chikkajajur).

Shivani Railway Station is a commercial location and has several wholesale and retail businesses.

THAGGINAHALLI

Bukkambudhi is an important place within Shivani Hobli and is about 4 kilometres west of Shivani.
Naranapura is one of the large mandal panchayath in shivani. Near 5000 peoples are living there. Bankanakatte and Menasinakayihosally are including there panchayath. In Naranapura 75% lingayaths are there so many temples likely Basaveshwara temple, Antaragattamma are main temples.

'Thyagadakatte' is also one of the large mandal panchayath in shivani. Near 2000 peoples are living there. Bandre and Banur are including there panchayath. In Thyagakatte 75% lingayaths are there so many temples likely Thyagadakattemma temple, Gullamma are main temples.

'BANDRE' is one of the villages in Thyagadakatte panchayath in shivani. Near 600 peoples are living there. Beeranahalli and Shivani railway station are including Thyagadakatte panchayath. In Bandre  98% lingayaths are there so many temples likely Thimmappa temple, Basavanna are main temples.

Villages
Some of the villages in SHIVANI Hobli:Siragalipura
Shivani
THAGGINAHALLI, Naranapura
BANDRE
Chiranahalli
Dandur
Karehalli
Kallenahalli
Bakthanakatte
Gadi Rangapura
Gijekatte
Giriyapura
Basavapura
Thyagadakatte
Banur
Tadaga
Hanuvanahalli
Bankanakatte,

References

External links
Railway network map of Shivani Railway Station
Police Information
 School at Shivani

Villages in Chikkamagaluru district